The Bhutan Volleyball Federation (BVBF) is the governing body of volleyball in Bhutan, it manages the Bhutan men's national volleyball team.

The federation is currently struggling to promote the game in the country due to lack of funds. Volleyball is an indoor game, but all of the games organized by the Federation are played outdoors. This is because the federation does not have an indoor court yet to hold games in. The players play outdoors in harsh conditions such as during the rain, under scorching sun and wind. The tournaments are conducted in the open space at the Changlimithang in Thimphu.

With the recent introduction of Volleyball Super League in Bhutan by the federation, the country can hope for new players being produced from this tournament who could be capable of representing the national team at international stage.

References

Volleyball in Bhutan
National men's volleyball teams
volleyball
Men's sport in Bhutan